The Mystery of the Black Pearl is a 1912 Australian silent film. A detective drama, It is now considered a lost film.

Cast
Cyril Mackay as Dick Weston
Sydney Stirling as Dudley Segrave
Leonard Willey as Sam Grimm
Charles Lawrence
Joseph Brennan
Irby Marshall

References

External links

1912 films
Australian drama films
Australian silent films
Australian black-and-white films
Lost Australian films
1912 drama films
1912 lost films
Lost drama films
Films directed by Franklyn Barrett
Silent drama films